Azghand (also known as Azghaneh, Azhand, and Azqand) is a village in and the capital of Azghand Rural District, Shadmehr District, Mahvelat County, Razavi Khorasan Province, Iran. At the 2006 census, its population was 1,313, in 402 families.

See also 

 List of cities, towns and villages in Razavi Khorasan Province

References 

Populated places in Mahvelat County